Statistics of League of Ireland in the 1951/1952 season.

Overview
It was contested by 12 teams, and, in their first season in the League of Ireland, St Patrick's Athletic remarkably won the championship.

Teams

Team changes

Stadiums and locations

Final classification

Results

Top scorers

Ireland
League of Ireland seasons
1951–52 in Republic of Ireland association football